Chao Ratchabut (Mokfa Na Nan) was a Thai royal.

Chao Ratchabut was the son of Chao Mahaphrom Surathada, the final Nan ruler. He had a granddaughter, Chao Somprathana Na Nan. The house Khum Chao Ratchabut was named after Mokfa Na Nan.

References

Year of birth missing
Year of death missing
Lan Na royalty
People from Nan province